Steve Brain (born ) is a retired rugby union player who played hooker for Coventry R.F.C. and represented England in over a dozen international matches, including three Five Nations, now the Six Nations Championship, between 1984 and 1986.

International Appearances (England)
 
1984 v South Africa (Johannesburg) L 35-9
1984 v Australia (R) (Twickenham) L 19-3
1985 v Romania (Twickenham) W 22-15
1985 v France (Twickenham) D 9-9 (FN)
1985 v Scotland (Twickenham) W 10-7 (FN)
1985 v Ireland (Dublin) L 13-10 (FN)
1985 v Wales (Cardiff) L 24-15 (FN)
1985 v New Zealand (Christchurch) L 18-13
1985 v New Zealand (Wellington) L 42-15
1986 v Wales (Twickenham) W 21-18 (FN)
1986 v Scotland (Murrayfield) L 33-6 (FN)
1986 v Ireland (Twickenham) W 25-20 (FN)
1986 v France (Paris) L 29-10 (FN)

Career Record P13, W4, D1, L8
Test Points: 0

(R) = Replacement

Club Affiliations
Coventry RFC
Kenilworth RFC
Moseley RFC
Mystic River Rugby Club (USA)
Rugby Lions (England)
Solihull R.F.C.

External links
Coventry rugby fan site featuring Brain
Steve Brain Stats at www.scrum.com
Kenilworth R.F.C. - History
The Rugby Football Club - History
The Mystic River Rugby Club - History

1954 births
English rugby union players
Living people
Rugby union players from Coventry
Rugby union hookers
England international rugby union players
Mystic River Rugby players